Bid Korpeh-ye Sofla (also Romanized as Bīd Korpeh-ye Soflá; also known as Bidkarih Sofla, Bid Korpeh, and Bīdkorpeh-ye Pā’īn) is a village in Kamazan-e Sofla Rural District, Zand District, Malayer County, Hamadan Province, Iran. At the 2006 census, its population was 149, in 34 families.

References 

Populated places in Malayer County